Burn rate is another term for negative cashflow in economics. It may also refer to:

 Burn rate (chemistry), the rate at which a reactant is consumed
 Burn rate (rocketry), the rate at which a rocket is burning fuel
Burn Rate, a nonfiction book